Creative Capital is a 501(c)3 nonprofit organization based in New York City that supports artists across the United States through funding, counsel, gatherings, and career development services. Since its founding in 1999, Creative Capital has committed over $50 million in project funding and advisory support to 631 projects representing 783 artists and has worked with thousands more artists across the country through workshops and other resources. One of the "most prestigious art grants in the country," their yearly Creative Capital Awards application is open to artists in over 40 different disciplines spanning the visual arts, performing arts, moving image, literature, technology, and socially-engaged art.

Their stated mission is to “amplify the voices of artists working in all creative disciplines and catalyze connections to help them realize their visions and build sustainable practices.”

History 
During the "culture wars" of the 1990s, the National Endowment for the Arts's (NEA) cut funding for individual artists. In response, Arch Gillies of the Andy Warhol Foundation for the Visual Arts spearheaded the creation of a new organization that would directly fund individual artists. Creative Capital began in 1999 with Ruby Lerner as Founding Director. The announcement of the organization appeared on the front page of The New York Times, noting that Creative Capital would "actively advocate freedom of expression" and "support artists who challenge convention."

In its first year, Creative Capital launched by selecting 75 artists to receive the Creative Capital Award. In 2002, the organization launched their first Artist Retreat at Skowhegan School of Painting. This in-person meeting of artists and professionals became a core part of Creative Capital's model, allowing for an exchange of ideas and as well as a platform to spark new connections within the community.

Creative Capital has supported many artists whose projects have become well recognized in their fields and beyond, including Paul Beatty’s The Sellout, Yance Ford’s Strong Island, Bill Morrison’s Decasia, Bandaloop's Crossing, Sam Van Aken’s Tree of 40 Fruits, Jae Rhim Lee’s Infinity Burial Project, Maggie Nelson’s The Argonauts, as well as early works by artists like Taylor Mac, Sanford Biggers, Laura Poitras, and Jeffrey Gibson.

In 2019, Creative Capital celebrated their 20th anniversary, announcing a yearly award and retreat cycle. In partnership with the Los Angeles Review of Books, Creative Capital invited several writers to examine projects from each award cycle year in the organization's first two decades.

Creative Capital Awards 
Through an open application process, Creative Capital identifies and selects artists from all disciplines to receive the Creative Capital Award. The award gives each project access to $50,000 in direct funding allocated at key intervals in project development, combined with additional mentorship and advisory services.

While there were a total of 12 award cycles from 2000 to 2019, in 2019 for their 20th anniversary, Creative Capital announced a new annual award cycle.

Philanthropic Model and Artist Services 
Creative Capital calls for artists to submit their project ideas through a free and open application for the Creative Capital Awards. After selecting artists for the awards, the organization applies a venture philanthropy model to help those artists develop their projects with funding, professional development, and advisory services, including artist coaching, communications and promotion, strategic planning, and legal and financial counsel. The award gives artists access to a series of gatherings, like the Artist Retreat, designed to connect them with a community of artists and professionals who can help realize and present their work at venues and organizations all over the world.

Creative Capital's approach centers on the idea that time and advisory services are as important to the creative process as money. As awardees' funded projects develop, Creative Capital staff meet with them to set goals and chart progress. Creative Capital provides funding at benchmark moments for each project, including initial funding, support to build the artist's personal and professional capacity, follow-up support for project production, funding for the project's premiere, and support for the project's expansion after its premiere. Of this type of support, Sheryl Oring, a Creative Capital Awardee, has said, "For mid-career artists like me, Creative Capital can help make the difference between whether we keep making art or give up."

Creative Capital Award recipients

Notable awardees include 
Performing Arts

Performing arts works funded by Creative Capital often blur the genres, including musical performance, theater, comedy, puppetry, dance, jazz, and multimedia installation. Notable projects include James Scruggs's 3/Fifths, Robin Frohardt's The Plastic Bag Store, Kyle Abraham's Dearest Home, Nick Cave's Drop, Taylor Mac's The Lily’s Revenge, and Young Jean Lee's Lear.
 Nick Cave
Raja Feather Kelly
Vijay Iyer
 Meredith Monk
 Taylor Mac
 Du Yun
 Ralph Lemon
 Jane Comfort
 John Jasperse
 James Luna
 Richard Maxwell
 Richard Move
 Basil Twist
 Kristina Wong
 Michelle Ellsworth
 Brian Harnetty
 Jesse Bonnell
 Branden Jacobs-Jenkins and Carmelita Tropicana
Visual Arts

Visual arts projects that have received Creative Capital Awards include installation, painting, sculpture, photography, and public art. Notable funded projects include Abigail DeVille’s The Bronx: History of Now, Richard Pell’s Center for PostNatural History, Jennie C. Jones’ Counterpoint, Critical Art Ensemble’s GenTerra, and Lead Pencil Studios’ Maryhill Double.
 Janine Antoni
 Cassils
 Mariam Ghani
 Narcissister
 My Barbarian
 Lorraine O'Grady
 Wu Tsang
 Sanford Biggers
 Liz Cohen
 Theaster Gates
 Simone Leigh
 William Pope.L
 Xenobia Bailey
 LaToya Ruby Frazier
 Kerry Skarbakka
Moving Image

Creative Capital Projects in moving image include narrative and documentary film, short, episodic, and experimental film, animation, and video art. Notable projects include Penny Lane's documentary, NUTS!, Barbara Hammer's Resisting Paradise, Sam Green's The Weather Underground, as well as Yance Ford's Strong Island, and Daniel Sousa's Feral, both of which were nominated for Academy Awards.
 Natalia Almada
 Sam Green
 Sonali Gulati
 Barbara Hammer
 Nina Menkes
 Elisabeth Subrin
 Jake Yuzna
 Jem Cohen
 Caveh Zahedi
 Travis Wilkerson
 Penny Lane
 Natalia Almada
 Yance Ford
Literature

Creative Capital began funding literature projects in 2005, including poetry, fiction, nonfiction, and hybrid literary works. Notable projects include Paul Beatty's The Sellout, Maggie Nelson's The Argonauts, and Bernadette Mayer's The Helens of Troy, New York.
 Jeffery Renard Allen
 Jesse Ball
 Paul Beatty
 Percival Everett
 Tonya Foster
 Kenny Fries
 Christian Hawkey
 Ben Marcus
 Bernadette Mayer
 Eileen Myles
 Maggie Nelson
 Rebecca Solnit
 Deb Olin Unferth
Emerging Fields

Since 2000, Creative Capital has funded projects under a particular discipline they call “emerging fields,” which includes disciplines not typically classified as art. As of 2019, the category has been broken out into more specific categories, such as technology, social practice, software, architecture & design. Some notable artists funded in this category include:
 Jae Rhim Lee
Sam Van Aken
DesertArtLAB
Futurefarmers
 The Yes Men
 Angel Nevarez and Valerie Tevere
 Tale of Tales
 Liz Glynn
 KCHUNG Radio
 Tanya Aguiñiga
 Zach Blas
 Porpentine and Peter Burr
 Heather Dewey-Hagborg
 Eva and Franco Mattes
 Laura Parnes
 Evan Roth
 Shana Moulton and Nick Hallett

Artist Retreat
After each new round of awards is announced, Creative Capital hosts a retreat for the artists, as well as people connected to Creative Capital in various ways who act as consultants, workshop leaders or observers. In various workshops and meetings with consultants, artists are advised on how to plan the coming years of their artistic careers as well their personal goals.

Creative Capital hosts a variety of events for awardees to meet each other and others within the artistic community. Critic Paddy Johnson wrote, "These conferences offer grantees an amazing opportunity to connect with other artists and a wide range of curators, distributors, and artistic directors through mixers, meetings with consultants, and artist presentations. They also ask grantees to return to the conference every couple of years, which keeps them in touch with a constantly expanding network of creative art folk."

Awardees are also asked to present their Creative Capital Award project ideas as a work-in-progress to a live audience of curators and presenters. These presentations are uploaded to YouTube and can be viewed by the public.

Workshops and Resources 
In 2003 Creative Capital started producing workshops, offering all artists access to online and in-person workshops to help them with skills such as communication and marketing, strategic planning, self-management, fundraising, and community building. Many of the programs are developed and led by Creative Capital Awardees, using the affordable workshop model to give them a platform to share their expertise. The workshops have been described as a "crash course in self-management, strategic planning, fundraising and promotion."

During the pandemic in 2020, Creative Capital provided online resources including free artist workshops. The organization was also a member of Artist Relief, an emergency coalition of national arts grantmakers to support artists during the COVID-19 crisis.

References

External links
 Creative-Capital.org
 Nashville Business Journal features a workshop led by the Creative Capital Professional Development Program in Nashville
 New York Times article on the first round of Creative Capital grantees
 LA Times article on Creative Capital's impact
 Fast Company article on Creative Capital's use of venture philanthropy
 99u interview with President of Creative Capital, Ruby Lerner
 New York Times article in which Creative Capital's Professional Development Program is mentioned
 Funding the Arts: Pay to Play – Art in America
 The Cult Appeal of the Creative Capital Retreat
 Creative Capital: April 30–June 6, 2010 – exhibition
 A Spark for Good Art: Creative Capital doesn’t just fund projects, it builds careers

Arts organizations based in New York City
Arts organizations established in 1999
1999 establishments in New York (state)